Christopher F. Karpowitz (born January 13, 1969) is an associate professor of political science at Brigham Young University. He is also an associate director of Brigham Young University's Center for the Study of Elections and Democracy.

He co-authored The Silent Sex: Gender, Deliberation, and Institutions with Tali Mendelberg.

Early life 
Christopher F. Karpowitz is the son of Dennis and Diane Karpowitz and he attended Lawrence High School, in Kansas.

Education
Karpowitz gained his degree in political science and his masters in American studies from Brigham Young University. He studied for a certificate of graduate studies in political theory at Duke University, and gained his masters and PhD in American politics at Princeton University.

Writings and research
Karpowitz was a contributor to The New York Times  "Room for Debate" section of writings in 2011 on whether Americans were ready for a Mormon president.

His findings that women speak less in male dominated groups have been widely reported on. He and Mendelburg have also had op-ed articles published in a wide variety of newspapers. He has also done extensive research on the effects of caucauses verses primaries. He also has been solicited by various national publications for comments on political situations in Utah.

Awards
 2012 Best Paper Award: Political Psychology Section from APSA (with Tali Mendelberg)

Books

See also
Deliberative democracy
Feminist philosophy 
Feminist theory 
Political philosophy

References

External links
 Profile page: Christopher F. Karpowitz, Department of Political Science, Brigham Young University.

1969 births
American philosophers
American political scientists
Brigham Young University alumni
Brigham Young University faculty
Duke University alumni
Living people
People from Lawrence, Kansas
Princeton University alumni